Glyphipterix acrothecta is a species of sedge moth in the genus Glyphipterix. It was described by Edward Meyrick in 1880. It is found in New Zealand.

References

Moths described in 1880
Glyphipterigidae
Moths of New Zealand
Endemic fauna of New Zealand
Taxa named by Edward Meyrick
Endemic moths of New Zealand